StockTouch is a discontinued visual stock market analysis and tracking app for iPad and iPhone developed by Visible Market, Inc.

StockTouch was noted for its intuitive, game-like interface, and until it closed down, was consistently rated in the top finance apps for iPad, and had been recognized as one of the top 5 stock market apps.

History
StockTouch was created to give users a visual picture of the overall state of the stock market. It merged real time financial information with data visualization technology. Visible Market is a New York-based company.
 
The concept for the app was based on a desire to clarify vast amounts of financial data. The developers noticed a trend among business professionals to move away from desktop tools and towards mobile ones. In response, they initiated the creation of a different, non-linear app which would visually track stock market trends. StockTouch was intended as a platform that provided “democratized” financial information for making the stock market more accessible to the general public. To that end, Visible Market was a forerunner among tech companies to use game engine technology and animation in the design of its mobile app, with the goal of helping users to visualize and navigate financial data.

StockTouch debuted on June 29, 2011 at a cost of $4.99. It spent several weeks as the most downloaded paid financial app. In order to reach an even wider audience, Johnson announced that with the launch of StockTouch 1.9, the app would be available for free beginning in April 2013.

On September 1, 2016, the app relaunched, only to shut down again on Q1 of 2017.

Product
The StockTouch app provided a dynamic, “at-a-glance” portrait of the stock market. The user is initially presented with a screen of organized tiles representing a “tactile heat map” of stock activity. It tracks thousands of stocks, organized into nine industry sectors: Consumer, Services, Healthcare, Energy, Technology, Financial, Industrial, Materials, and Utilities. Users touch the individual tiles, each with a color corresponding to the stock's degree of positive or negative performance. Selecting a tile displays “everything about that stock,” including user-specified time graphs and relevant news items. Stock information is refreshed every five minutes, provided in partnership with Xignite. StockTouch is hosted on AWS and is used by Wall Street traders, executives, investors and academics.

Awards and recognition
 Reached #1 in Finance Apps, iPad, April 3, 2013
 App Store Essentials App, 2013
 Reached #2 in Finance Apps, iPhone, October 5, 2012
 Apple Rewind, “#1 finance app,” 2011
 Apps Magazine, “Best Work App,” 2011 
 One of “Best 10 Business Apps for iPad” 
 Visible Market, Inc. selected as FinTech Innovation Lab incubator company, 2012
 Apple Hall of Fame App, December 2012

External links

References

Companies based in New York (state)
Financial services companies established in 2011
Defunct technology companies of the United States
IOS software